This is a list of contributors to the mathematical background for general relativity. For ease of readability, the contributions (in brackets) are unlinked but can be found in the contributors' article.

B
 Luigi Bianchi (Bianchi identities, Bianchi groups, differential geometry)

C
 Élie Cartan (curvature computation, early extensions of GTR, Cartan geometries)
 Elwin Bruno Christoffel (connections, tensor calculus, Riemannian geometry)
 Clarissa-Marie Claudel (Geometry of photon surfaces)

D
 Tevian Dray (The Geometry of General Relativity)

E
 Luther P. Eisenhart (semi-Riemannian geometries)
 Frank B. Estabrook (Wahlquist-Estabrook approach to solving PDEs; see also parent list)
 Leonhard Euler (Euler-Lagrange equation, from which the geodesic equation is obtained)

G
 Carl Friedrich Gauss (curvature, theory of surfaces, intrinsic vs. extrinsic)

K
 Martin Kruskal (inverse scattering transform; see also parent list)

L
 Joseph Louis Lagrange (Lagrangian mechanics, Euler-Lagrange equation)
 Tullio Levi-Civita (tensor calculus, Riemannian geometry; see also parent list)
 André Lichnerowicz (tensor calculus, transformation groups)

M
 Alexander Macfarlane (space analysis and Algebra of Physics) 
 Jerrold E. Marsden (linear stability)

N
 Isaac Newton (Newton's identities for characteristic of Einstein tensor)

R
 Gregorio Ricci-Curbastro (Ricci tensor, differential geometry)
 Georg Bernhard Riemann (Riemannian geometry, Riemann curvature tensor)

S
 Richard Schoen (Yamabe problem; see also parent list)
 Corrado Segre (Segre classification)

W
 Hugo D. Wahlquist (Wahlquist-Estabrook algorithm; see also parent list)
 Hermann Weyl (Weyl tensor, gauge theories; see also parent list)
 Eugene P. Wigner (stabilizers in Lorentz group)

See also

 Contributors to differential geometry
 Contributors to general relativity

Physics-related lists